Végétale is the third studio album by the rock band Ulan Bator. It was released in 1997.

Track listing
All Lyrics By Amaury Cambuzat.  All Music Written & Arranged By Ulan Bator.
"Lumiere Blanche / Schneetum"  – 8:11
"Cephalopode"  – 5:44
"Pekisch Organ" (part 1+2) – 6:12
"Fievre Hectique" (part 1+2) – 6:18
"Hart"  – 6:26
"Fuite"  – 5:44
"Embarquement"  – 7:13

Personnel
Amaury Cambuzat: Vocals, Guitars, Piano, Tapes
Oliver Manchion: Bass, Flute, Metal Percussion, Tapes
Franck Latignac: Drums, Percussion, Tabla, Trumpet

Production
Arranged By Ulan Bator
Produced By Ulan Bator & Gerard Nguyen
Recorded By Ulan Bator
Mix Engineered By François Dietz
Mastered By Tom Meyer
All Songs Copyright Les Disques du Soleil et de l'Alcier, 1997

References

1997 albums
Ulan Bator (band) albums